is a highly eccentric, rare-type asteroid, classified as near-Earth object of the Apollo group of asteroids, approximately 2 kilometers in diameter. It was discovered on 5 January 1994, by Australian amateur astronomer Gordon Garradd during the AANEAS survey at the Siding Spring Observatory, Australia.

Orbit and classification 

The asteroid orbits the Sun at a distance of 0.7–4.3 AU once every 4.04 years (1,477 days). Its orbit has an eccentricity of 0.71 and an inclination of 10° with respect to the ecliptic. It is a member of the Alinda group of asteroids with a 3:1 resonance with Jupiter that has excited the eccentricity of the orbit over the eons. As an Alinda asteroid it makes approaches to Jupiter, Earth, and Venus.

Due to its elongated orbit, it also approaches the orbit of Jupiter within . On 4 January 2079, it will pass  from the Earth.

A first precovery was taken at the discovering observatory in 1981, extending the asteroid's observation arc by 13 years prior to its discovery.

Physical characteristics 

In the SMASS classification,  is characterized as a rare O-type asteroid.

Rotation period 

In the late 1990s, Czech astronomer Petr Pravec obtained two rotational lightcurves for this asteroid from photometric observations taken at the Ondřejov Observatory, Czech Republic.

Diameter and albedo 

According to the survey carried out by the NEOWISE mission of NASA's Wide-field Infrared Survey Explorer, the asteroid measures 1.86 kilometers in diameter and its surface has an albedo of 0.154. The Collaborative Asteroid Lightcurve Link assumes an albedo of 0.18 and calculates a diameter of 2.17 kilometers, based on an absolute magnitude of 15.8. American astronomer Richard Binzel gives a diameter of 2.2 kilometers.

Naming 

As of 2017,  remains unnamed.

Notes

References

External links 
 AANEAS: A Valedictory Report, AANEAS Discoveries 1990-96
 Asteroid Lightcurve Database (LCDB), query form (info )
 Dictionary of Minor Planet Names, Google books
 Asteroids and comets rotation curves, CdR – Observatoire de Genève, Raoul Behrend
 
 
 

008201
008201
Discoveries by Gordon J. Garradd
008201
19940105